The Cherokee Casino Roland is a casino complex located in Roland, Oklahoma. It is owned and operated by Cherokee Nation Entertainment, a division of Cherokee Nation Businesses (which is a wholly owned subsidiary of the Cherokee Nation).

Casino
The casino is located in Roland, Oklahoma near the Oklahoma-Arkansas state line, I-40, and US Highway 64. It is open 24 hours a day has 170,000 square feet, 850 gaming machines, and 9 table games including blackjack and poker variations.

Hotel, restaurant, and travel plaza
The Buffet is an onsite restaurant and offers cuisine from all four corners of the world. Cherokee Casino & Hotel Roland is located right off of I-40 and Highway 64, Exit 325. It is only 10 minutes from Ft. Smith, Arkansas. There are 120 non-smoking hotel rooms, including 12 suites.

References

External links
Cherokee Casino Roland, Cherokee Star Rewards
Cherokee Casino Roland, Oklahoma Tourism & Recreation Department website

Cherokee Nation buildings and structures
Casinos in Oklahoma
Buildings and structures in Sequoyah County, Oklahoma
Native American casinos
Tourist attractions in Sequoyah County, Oklahoma